Vide may refer to:

A Latin phrase, see vide (Latin)
Vide (Seia), Portuguese parish
Jacobus Vide (fl. 1405–1433), Franco-Flemish composer
Joe Vide (born 1984), American soccer player